Metabolic syndrome is a clustering of at least three of the following five medical conditions: abdominal obesity, high blood pressure, high blood sugar, high serum triglycerides, and low serum high-density lipoprotein (HDL).

Metabolic syndrome is associated with the risk of developing cardiovascular disease and type 2 diabetes. In the U.S., about 25% of the adult population has metabolic syndrome, a proportion increasing with age, particularly among racial and ethnic minorities.

Insulin resistance, metabolic syndrome, and prediabetes are closely related to one another and have overlapping aspects. The syndrome is thought to be caused by an underlying disorder of energy utilization and storage. The cause of the syndrome is an area of ongoing medical research.

Signs and symptoms 
The key sign of metabolic syndrome is central obesity, also known as visceral, male-pattern or apple-shaped adiposity. It is characterized by adipose tissue accumulation predominantly around the waist and trunk. Other signs of metabolic syndrome include high blood pressure, decreased fasting serum HDL cholesterol, elevated fasting serum triglyceride level, impaired fasting glucose, insulin resistance, or prediabetes. Associated conditions include hyperuricemia; fatty liver (especially in concurrent obesity) progressing to nonalcoholic fatty liver disease; polycystic ovarian syndrome in women and erectile dysfunction in men; and acanthosis nigricans.

Complication 
Metabolic syndrome can lead to several serious and chronic complications, including type-2 diabetes, cardiovascular diseases, stroke, kidney disease and nonalcoholic fatty liver disease.

Causes
The mechanisms of the complex pathways of metabolic syndrome are under investigation. The pathophysiology is very complex and has been only partially elucidated. Most people affected by the condition are older, obese, sedentary, and have a degree of insulin resistance. Stress can also be a contributing factor. The most important risk factors are diet (particularly sugar-sweetened beverage consumption), genetics, aging, sedentary behavior or low physical activity, disrupted chronobiology/sleep, mood disorders/psychotropic medication use, and excessive alcohol use. The pathogenic role played in the syndrome by the excessive expansion of adipose tissue occurring under sustained overeating, and its resulting lipotoxicity was reviewed by Vidal-Puig.

There is debate regarding whether obesity or insulin resistance is the cause of the metabolic syndrome or if they are consequences of a more far-reaching metabolic derangement. Markers of systemic inflammation, including C-reactive protein, are often increased, as are fibrinogen, interleukin 6, tumor necrosis factor-alpha (TNF-α), and others. Some have pointed to a variety of causes, including increased uric acid levels caused by dietary fructose.

Research shows that Western diet habits are a factor in development of metabolic syndrome, with high consumption of food that is not biochemically suited to humans. Weight gain is associated with metabolic syndrome. Rather than total adiposity, the core clinical component of the syndrome is visceral and/or ectopic fat (i.e., fat in organs not designed for fat storage) whereas the principal metabolic abnormality is insulin resistance. The continuous provision of energy via dietary carbohydrate, lipid, and protein fuels, unmatched by physical activity/energy demand, creates a backlog of the products of mitochondrial oxidation, a process associated with progressive mitochondrial dysfunction and insulin resistance.

Stress
Recent research indicates prolonged chronic stress can contribute to metabolic syndrome by disrupting the hormonal balance of the hypothalamic-pituitary-adrenal axis (HPA-axis). A dysfunctional HPA-axis causes high cortisol levels to circulate, which results in raising glucose and insulin levels, which in turn cause insulin-mediated effects on adipose tissue, ultimately promoting visceral adiposity, insulin resistance, dyslipidemia and hypertension, with direct effects on the bone, causing "low turnover" osteoporosis. HPA-axis dysfunction may explain the reported risk indication of abdominal obesity to cardiovascular disease (CVD), type 2 diabetes and stroke. Psychosocial stress is also linked to heart disease.

Obesity
Central obesity is a key feature of the syndrome, being both a sign and a cause, in that the increasing adiposity often reflected in high waist circumference may both result from and contribute to insulin resistance. However, despite the importance of obesity, affected people who are of normal weight may also be insulin-resistant and have the syndrome.

Sedentary lifestyle
Physical inactivity is a predictor of CVD events and related mortality. Many components of metabolic syndrome are associated with a sedentary lifestyle, including increased adipose tissue (predominantly central); reduced HDL cholesterol; and a trend toward increased triglycerides, blood pressure, and glucose in the genetically susceptible. Compared with individuals who watched television or videos or used their computers for less than one hour daily, those who carried out these behaviors for greater than four hours daily have a twofold increased risk of metabolic syndrome.

Aging
Metabolic syndrome affects 60% of the U.S. population older than age 50. With respect to that demographic, the percentage of women having the syndrome is higher than that of men. The age dependency of the syndrome's prevalence is seen in most populations around the world.

Diabetes mellitus type 2

The metabolic syndrome quintuples the risk of type 2 diabetes mellitus. Type 2 diabetes is considered a complication of metabolic syndrome. In people with impaired glucose tolerance or impaired fasting glucose, presence of metabolic syndrome doubles the risk of developing type 2 diabetes. It is likely that prediabetes and metabolic syndrome denote the same disorder, defining it by the different sets of biological markers.

The presence of metabolic syndrome is associated with a higher prevalence of CVD than found in people with type 2 diabetes or impaired glucose tolerance without the syndrome. Hypoadiponectinemia has been shown to increase insulin resistance and is considered to be a risk factor for developing metabolic syndrome.

Coronary heart disease
The approximate prevalence of the metabolic syndrome in people with coronary artery disease (CAD) is 50%, with a prevalence of 37% in people with premature coronary artery disease (age 45), particularly in women. With appropriate cardiac rehabilitation and changes in lifestyle (e.g., nutrition, physical activity, weight reduction, and, in some cases, drugs), the prevalence of the syndrome can be reduced.

Lipodystrophy
Lipodystrophic disorders in general are associated with metabolic syndrome. Both genetic (e.g., Berardinelli-Seip congenital lipodystrophy, Dunnigan familial partial lipodystrophy) and acquired (e.g., HIV-related lipodystrophy in people treated with highly active antiretroviral therapy) forms of lipodystrophy may give rise to severe insulin resistance and many of metabolic syndrome's components.

Rheumatic diseases
There is research that associates comorbidity with rheumatic diseases. Both psoriasis and psoriatic arthritis have been found to be associated with metabolic syndrome.

Chronic obstructive pulmonary disease
Metabolic syndrome is seen to be a comorbidity in up to 50 percent of those with chronic obstructive pulmonary disease (COPD). It may pre-exist or may be a consequence of the lung pathology of COPD.

Pathophysiology
It is common for there to be a development of visceral fat, after which the adipocytes (fat cells) of the visceral fat increase plasma levels of TNF-α and alter levels of other substances (e.g., adiponectin, resistin, and PAI-1). TNF-α has been shown to cause the production of inflammatory cytokines and also possibly trigger cell signaling by interaction with a TNF-α receptor that may lead to insulin resistance. An experiment with rats fed a diet with 33% sucrose has been proposed as a model for the development of metabolic syndrome. The sucrose first elevated blood levels of triglycerides, which induced visceral fat and ultimately resulted in insulin resistance. The progression from visceral fat to increased TNF-α to insulin resistance has some parallels to human development of metabolic syndrome. The increase in adipose tissue also increases the number of immune cells, which play a role in inflammation. Chronic inflammation contributes to an increased risk of hypertension, atherosclerosis and diabetes.

The involvement of the endocannabinoid system in the development of metabolic syndrome is indisputable. Endocannabinoid overproduction may induce reward system dysfunction and cause executive dysfunctions (e.g., impaired delay discounting), in turn perpetuating unhealthy behaviors. The brain is crucial in development of metabolic syndrome, modulating peripheral carbohydrate and lipid metabolism.

Metabolic syndrome can be induced by overfeeding with sucrose or fructose, particularly concomitantly with high-fat diet. The resulting oversupply of omega-6 fatty acids, particularly arachidonic acid (AA), is an important factor in the pathogenesis of metabolic syndrome. Arachidonic acid (with its precursor – linoleic acid) serves as a substrate to the production of inflammatory mediators known as eicosanoids, whereas the arachidonic acid-containing compound diacylglycerol (DAG) is a precursor to the endocannabinoid 2-arachidonoylglycerol (2-AG) while fatty acid amide hydrolase (FAAH) mediates the metabolism of anandamide into arachidonic acid. Anandamide can also be produced from N-acylphosphatidylethanolamine via several pathways. Anandamide and 2-AG can also be hydrolized into arachidonic acid, potentially leading to increased eicosanoid synthesis.

Diagnosis 
The International Diabetes Federation Task Force on Epidemiology and Prevention; the National Heart, Lung, and Blood Institute; the American Heart Association; the World Heart Federation; the International Atherosclerosis Society; and the International Association for the Study of Obesity published an interim joint statement to harmonize the definition of the metabolic syndrome. This definition recognizes that the risk associated with a particular waist measurement will differ in different populations. Whether it is better at this time to set the level at which risk starts to increase or at which there is already substantially increased risk will be up to local decision-making groups. However, for international comparisons and to facilitate the etiology, the organizations agree that it is critical that a commonly agreed-upon set of criteria be used worldwide, with agreed-upon cut points for different ethnic groups and sexes. There are many people in the world of mixed ethnicity, and in those cases, pragmatic decisions will have to be made. Therefore, an international criterion of overweight may be more appropriate than ethnic specific criteria of abdominal obesity for an anthropometric component of this syndrome which results from an excess lipid storage in adipose tissue, skeletal muscle and liver.

The previous definitions of the metabolic syndrome by the International Diabetes Federation (IDF) and the revised National Cholesterol Education Program (NCEP) are very similar, and they identify individuals with a given set of symptoms as having metabolic syndrome. There are two differences, however: the IDF definition states that if body mass index (BMI) is greater than 30 kg/m2, central obesity can be assumed, and waist circumference does not need to be measured.  However, this potentially excludes any subject without increased waist circumference if BMI is less than 30. Conversely, the NCEP definition indicates that metabolic syndrome can be diagnosed based on other criteria. Also, the IDF uses geography-specific cut points for waist circumference, while NCEP uses only one set of cut points for waist circumference regardless of geography.

IDF
The International Diabetes Federation consensus worldwide definition of metabolic syndrome (2006) is:
Central obesity (defined as waist circumference# with ethnicity-specific values) AND any two of the following:
 Raised triglycerides: > 150 mg/dL (1.7 mmol/L), or specific treatment for this lipid abnormality
 Reduced HDL cholesterol:  < 40 mg/dL (1.03 mmol/L) in males, < 50 mg/dL (1.29 mmol/L) in females, or specific treatment for this lipid abnormality
 Raised blood pressure (BP): systolic BP > 130 or diastolic BP >85 mm Hg, or treatment of previously diagnosed hypertension
 Raised fasting plasma glucose (FPG): >100 mg/dL (5.6 mmol/L), or previously diagnosed type 2 diabetes
If FPG is >5.6 mmol/L or 100 mg/dL, an oral glucose tolerance test is strongly recommended, but is not necessary to define presence of the syndrome.
# If BMI is >30 kg/m2, central obesity can be assumed and waist circumference does not need to be measured

WHO
The World Health Organization (1999)  requires the presence of any one of diabetes mellitus, impaired glucose tolerance, impaired fasting glucose or insulin resistance, AND two of the following:
 Blood pressure ≥ 140/90 mmHg
 Dyslipidemia: triglycerides (TG) ≥ 1.695 mmol/L  and HDL cholesterol ≤ 0.9 mmol/L (male), ≤ 1.0 mmol/L (female)
 Central obesity: waist:hip ratio > 0.90 (male); > 0.85 (female), or BMI > 30 kg/m2
 Microalbuminuria: urinary albumin excretion ratio ≥ 20 µg/min or albumin:creatinine ratio ≥ 30 mg/g

EGIR
The European Group for the Study of Insulin Resistance (1999) requires insulin resistance defined as the top 25% of the fasting insulin values among nondiabetic individuals AND two or more of the following:
 Central obesity: waist circumference ≥ 94 cm or 37 inches (male), ≥ 80 cm or 31.5 inches (female)
 Dyslipidemia: TG ≥ 2.0 mmol/L and/or HDL-C < 1.0 mmol/L or treated for dyslipidemia
 Blood pressure ≥ 140/90 mmHg or antihypertensive medication
 Fasting plasma glucose ≥ 6.1 mmol/L

NCEP
The U.S. National Cholesterol Education Program Adult Treatment Panel III (2001) requires at least three of the following:
 Central obesity: waist circumference ≥ 102 cm or 40 inches (male), ≥ 88 cm or 35 inches(female)
 Dyslipidemia: TG ≥ 1.7 mmol/L (150 mg/dl)
 Dyslipidemia: HDL-C < 40 mg/dL (male), < 50 mg/dL (female)
 Blood pressure ≥ 130/85 mmHg (or treated for hypertension)
 Fasting plasma glucose ≥ 6.1 mmol/L (110 mg/dl)

American Heart Association
There is confusion as to whether, in 2004, the American Heart Association and National Heart, Lung, and Blood Institute intended to create another set of guidelines or simply update the National Cholesterol Education Program definition.
 Central obesity: waist circumference ≥ 102 cm or 40 inches (male), ≥ 88 cm or 35 inches(female)
 Dyslipidemia: TG ≥ 1.7 mmol/L (150 mg/dL)
 Dyslipidemia: HDL-C < 40 mg/dL (male), < 50 mg/dL (female)
 Blood pressure ≥ 130/85 mmHg (or treated for hypertension)
 Fasting plasma glucose ≥ 5.6 mmol/L (100 mg/dL), or use of medication for hyperglycemia

Cardiometabolic index
The Cardiometabolic index (CMI) is a tool used to calculate risk of type 2 diabetes, non-alcoholic fatty liver disease, and metabolic issues. It is based on calculations from waist-to-height ratio and triglycerides-to-HDL cholesterol ratio.

CMI can also be used for finding connections between cardiovascular disease and erectile dysfunction. When following an anti inflammatory diet (low-glycemic carbohydrates, fruits, vegetables, fish, less red meat and processed foods) the markers may drop resulting in a significant reduction in body weight and adipose tissue.

Other
High-sensitivity C-reactive protein has been developed and used as a marker to predict coronary vascular diseases in metabolic syndrome, and it was recently used as a predictor for nonalcoholic fatty liver disease (steatohepatitis) in correlation with serum markers that indicated lipid and glucose metabolism. Fatty liver disease and steatohepatitis can be considered manifestations of metabolic syndrome, indicative of abnormal energy storage as fat in ectopic distribution.
Reproductive disorders (such as polycystic ovary syndrome in women of reproductive age), and erectile dysfunction or decreased total testosterone (low testosterone-binding globulin) in men can be attributed to metabolic syndrome.

Prevention
Various strategies have been proposed to prevent the development of metabolic syndrome. These include increased physical activity (such as walking 30 minutes every day), and a healthy, reduced calorie diet.  Many studies support the value of a healthy lifestyle as above. However, one study stated these potentially beneficial measures are effective in only a minority of people, primarily because of a lack of compliance with lifestyle and diet changes. The International Obesity Taskforce states that interventions on a sociopolitical level are required to reduce development of the metabolic syndrome in populations.

The Caerphilly Heart Disease Study followed 2,375 male subjects over 20 years and suggested the daily intake of an Imperial pint (~568 mL) of milk or equivalent dairy products more than halved the risk of metabolic syndrome. Some subsequent studies support the authors' findings, while others dispute them. A systematic review of four randomized controlled trials said that, in the short term, a paleolithic nutritional pattern improved three of five measurable components of the metabolic syndrome in participants with at least one of the components.

Management

Medications
Generally, the individual disorders that compose the metabolic syndrome are treated separately. Diuretics and ACE inhibitors may be used to treat hypertension. Various cholesterol medications may be useful if LDL cholesterol, triglycerides, and/or HDL cholesterol is abnormal.

Diet
Dietary carbohydrate restriction reduces blood glucose levels, contributes to weight loss, and reduces the use of several medications that may be prescribed for metabolic syndrome.

Epidemiology

Approximately 20–25 percent of the world's adult population has the cluster of risk factors that is metabolic syndrome.  In 2000, approximately 32% of U.S. adults had metabolic syndrome. In more recent years that figure has climbed to 34%.

In young children, there is no consensus on how to measure metabolic syndrome since age-specific cut points and reference values that would indicate "high risk" have not been well established. A continuous cardiometabolic risk summary score is often used for children instead of a dichotomous measure of metabolic syndrome.

History
In 1921, Joslin first reported the association of diabetes with hypertension and hyperuricemia.
In 1923, Kylin reported additional studies on the above triad.
In 1947, Vague observed that upper body obesity appeared to predispose to diabetes, atherosclerosis, gout and calculi.
In the late 1950s, the term metabolic syndrome was first used.

In 1967, Avogadro, Crepaldi and coworkers described six moderately obese people with diabetes, hypercholesterolemia, and marked hypertriglyceridemia, all of which improved when the affected people were put on a hypocaloric, low-carbohydrate diet.
In 1977, Haller used the term "metabolic syndrome" for associations of obesity, diabetes mellitus, hyperlipoproteinemia, hyperuricemia, and hepatic steatosis when describing the additive effects of risk factors on atherosclerosis.
The same year, Singer used the term for associations of obesity, gout, diabetes mellitus, and hypertension with hyperlipoproteinemia.
In 1977 and 1978, Gerald B. Phillips developed the concept that risk factors for myocardial infarction concur to form a "constellation of abnormalities" (i.e., glucose intolerance, hyperinsulinemia, hypercholesterolemia, hypertriglyceridemia, and hypertension) associated not only with heart disease, but also with aging, obesity and other clinical states. He suggested there must be an underlying linking factor, the identification of which could lead to the prevention of cardiovascular disease; he hypothesized that this factor was sex hormones.
In 1988, in his Banting lecture, Gerald M. Reaven proposed insulin resistance as the underlying factor and named the constellation of abnormalities syndrome X. Reaven did not include abdominal obesity, which has also been hypothesized as the underlying factor, as part of the condition.

See also 
 Metabolic disorder
 Portal-visceral hypothesis

References

External links 

Diabetes
Endocrine diseases
Medical conditions related to obesity
Syndromes affecting the endocrine system
Syndromes with obesity